Salome's Last Dance is a 1988 British film written and directed by Ken Russell. Although most of the action is a verbatim performance of Oscar Wilde's 1891 play Salome, which is itself based on a story from the New Testament, there is also a framing narrative that was written by Russell.

Plot
Wilde (Nickolas Grace) and his lover Lord Alfred Douglas (Douglas Hodge) arrive late on Guy Fawkes Day in 1892 at their friend's brothel, where they are treated to a surprise staging of Wilde's play, public performances of which have just been banned in England by the Lord Chamberlain's office.

In the play, all the roles are played by prostitutes or their clients, and each actor (except Grace) plays two roles, one in the brothel and the other in the play. King Herod (Stratford Johns) begs his young stepdaughter Salome (Imogen Millais-Scott) to dance for him, promising to give her anything she desires, much to the irritation of her mother, Herodias (Glenda Jackson). Salome ignores him, choosing instead to try to seduce John the Baptist, who is Herod's prisoner.

John responds by loudly condemning both Herod and Salome in the name of God. A spurned and vengeful Salome then agrees to dance for Herod — on the condition that she be given anything she asks for. Herod agrees, but it is only after the dance is over that Salome asks for the head of John the Baptist on a platter. Herod is appalled, tries to dissuade her, but finally gives in to her request. The scenes from the play are interwoven with images of Wilde's exploits at the brothel. At the end Wilde is arrested.

Cast
 Glenda Jackson as Herodias / Lady Alice
 Stratford Johns as Herod / Alfred Taylor
 Nickolas Grace as Oscar Wilde
 Douglas Hodge as John the Baptist / Lord Alfred 'Bosie' Douglas
 Imogen Millais-Scott as Salome / Rose
 Denis Lill as Tigellenus / Chilvers
 Russell Lee Nash as Pageboy
 Ken Russell as Cappadocian / Kenneth (credited as Alfred Russell)
 David Doyle as A Nubian
 Warren Saire as Young Syrian
 Kenny Ireland as 1st Soldier
 Michael Van Wijk as 2nd Soldier
 Paul Clayton as 1st Nazarean
 Imogen Claire as 2nd Nazarean
 Tim Potter as Pharisee
 Leon Herbert as Namaan

Production
Ken Russell had been signed by Vestron to a three-picture deal after the success of Gothic, of which this was the first. Imogen Millais-Scott went blind three weeks before filming after contracting glandular fever but Russell insisted on still using her. It has been suggested that she was too weak to perform the dance sequence and a body double was used, but in any case a male of similar build performs Salome's dance and, at one point, flashes male genitals.

"It's a tale that can be interpreted in many ways," said Russell. "Years ago, I wrote it into a script titled Space Gospel, which was the New Testament in science-fiction. It didn't work out. I also thought of using the opera with the dance of the seven veils for my segment in Aria...  but they wanted $3,000 a minute for the music."

For dramatic effect, Russell compressed the actual arrest of Wilde in 1895 and the first performance of his play in Paris in 1896. Russell said, "Although the play was never produced in London during his lifetime - even though he had Sarah Bernhardt actually in rehearsals for it before it was banned - I just made up the conceit of showing it in the brothel to give a flavor of what his life at the time was like, and at the same time give a hint of the homosexual relationship with Bosie that really was his downfall. All of this is interwoven with the play, which is about love and corruption and deceit anyway."

Russell later claimed he made the film on a bet that he could not make a movie under $1 million. The film was made for $1.3 million with filming completed in three and a half weeks.

Shortly after filming Russell said "The critics haven't worn me down, so maybe I'm trying to wear them down. I'm also trying to reach a wider - and younger - audience, and make films that are more visually stimulating. It isn't easy. I've never made a film I was totally happy with. That's what keeps me going: the next one must be better."

Reception
This film met with modest critical praise. The review in The New York Times called it "a perfumed, comic stunt," but noted that "Mr. Russell forces one to attend to (and to discover the odd glory in) the Wilde language, which, on the printed page, works faster than valium."

The Los Angeles Times called it "languid and tedious... virtually devoid of genuine eroticism of any persuasion but also is so static that the play itself bores rather than involves."

References

External links

Salome's Last Dance at BFI

1988 films
British drama films
1988 LGBT-related films
British LGBT-related films
1980s English-language films
Cultural depictions of John the Baptist
Films based on Salome (play)
Films directed by Ken Russell
Vestron Pictures films
1980s British films